Aspidoglossum is a genus of plants in the family Apocynaceae, first described as a genus in 1838. It is native to Africa.

Accepted species

References

Apocynaceae genera
Asclepiadoideae